The 1890 Yale Bulldogs football team represented Yale University in the 1890 college football season. In its third year under head coach Walter Camp, the team compiled a 13–1 record, recorded 12 shutouts, and outscored all opponents by a total of 486 to 18.  Its only loss was to rival Harvard by a 12–6 score. 
  
Three Yale players (halfback Thomas McClung, guard Pudge Heffelfinger, and tackle William Rhodes) were consensus picks for the 1890 College Football All-America Team.  All three have also been inducted into the College Football Hall of Fame

Schedule

References

Yale
Yale Bulldogs football seasons
Yale Bulldogs football